Gary Yates (born 20 September 1967 in Ashton-under-Lyne, Lancashire) is a former English cricketer, an off-spinner who played for Lancashire from 1989 to 2004 taking 184 first-class wickets. He subsequently became 2nd team captain and coach. He has been assistant coach at Lancashire since 2008.

Yates attended Manchester Grammar School where he played alongside future England cricket captain Michael Atherton and future Lancs and Notts player Mark Crawley.

He is now coaching cricket at Merchant Taylors' Boys' School, Crosby.

References

1967 births
Living people
Lancashire cricketers
English cricketers
People educated at Manchester Grammar School
Marylebone Cricket Club cricketers